James Bryden Cooke (born 27 February 1935) is a Singaporean sailor. He competed in the Dragon event at the 1960 Summer Olympics.

References

External links
 

1935 births
Living people
Singaporean male sailors (sport)
Olympic sailors of Singapore
Sailors at the 1960 Summer Olympics – Dragon
Sportspeople from Christchurch